Virginia Lake is an alpine lake in Boise County, Idaho, United States, located high in the Sawtooth Mountains in the Sawtooth National Recreation Area. Located in the remote central Sawtooth Wilderness, Edna Lake can be reached by trails from many directions, including the Sawtooth Valley (east), Grandjean (northwest), Redfish Lake (north), and Atlanta (south).

Virginia Lake is in a basin with several other lakes, including Vernon Lake and Edna Lake along the spine of the Sawtooths just below the border of Boise, Custer, and Elmore counties.

Virginia Lake is in the Sawtooth Wilderness and wilderness permit can be obtained at trailheads.

References

See also
 List of lakes of the Sawtooth Mountains (Idaho)
 Sawtooth National Forest
 Sawtooth National Recreation Area
 Sawtooth Range (Idaho)

Lakes of Idaho
Lakes of Custer County, Idaho
Glacial lakes of the United States
Glacial lakes of the Sawtooth Wilderness